The 1959–60 Yugoslav First League season was the 14th season of the First Federal League, the top level association football league of SFR Yugoslavia, since its establishment in 1946. Twelve teams contested the competition, with Red Star winning their sixth title.

Teams
At the end of the previous season Željezničar and Vardar were relegated. They were replaced by OFK Belgrade and Sloboda Tuzla.

League table

Results

Top scorers

See also
1959–60 Yugoslav Second League
1959–60 Yugoslav Cup

References

External links
Yugoslavia Domestic Football Full Tables

Yugoslav First League seasons
Yugo
1959–60 in Yugoslav football